The Windows Package Manager (also known as winget) is a free and open-source package manager designed by Microsoft for Windows 10 and Windows 11. It consists of a command-line utility and a set of services for installing applications. Independent software vendors can use it as a distribution channel for their software packages.

History 
Windows Package Manager was first announced at the Microsoft Build developer conference in May 2020.

Before deciding to develop Windows Package Manager, the team behind it explored Chocolatey, Scoop, Ninite, AppGet, Npackd and the PowerShell-based OneGet. After the announcement of winget, the developer of AppGet, Keivan Beigi, claimed that Microsoft interviewed him in December 2019 under the pretense of employment and acquiring AppGet. After talking with Beigi, Microsoft allegedly ceased communication with him until confirming one day before the launch of winget that they would not be hiring him. Beigi was dismayed at Microsoft's lack of attribution of AppGet. The release of winget led Beigi to announce that AppGet would be discontinued in August 2020. Microsoft responded with a blog post crediting a number of winget's features to AppGet.

Microsoft released version 1.0 of Windows Package Manager on May 27, 2021. The Microsoft Community Repository included over 1,400 packages at that date.

Overview 
The winget tool supports installers based on EXE, MSIX, and MSI. The public Windows Package Manager Community repository hosts manifest files for supported applications in YAML format. In September 2020, Microsoft added the ability to install applications from the Microsoft Store and a command auto-completion feature.

To reduce the likelihood of non-Microsoft-approved software (see vendor lock-in), including malicious software, making its way into the repository and onto the target machine, Windows Package Manager uses Microsoft SmartScreen, static analysis, SHA256 hash validation and other processes.

The winget client source code and the community manifest repository are licensed under MIT License and hosted on GitHub.

Commands

Example 
The following example searches for and installs variable . 
winget install --id=$PKG_ID -e

Package ID Examples 

 Visual Studio Code, a code editor from Microsoft: 
 Google Chrome: 
 Mozilla Firefox: 
 Brave: 
 Vivaldi:

See also 

 Web Platform Installer
 NuGet
 Chocolatey
 Scoop Package Manager
 List of software package management systems

References

External links 
 Windows Package Manager | Microsoft Docs
 
 

2020 software
Command-line software
Free package management systems
Free software programmed in C++
Microsoft free software
Software using the MIT license
Windows-only free software